Theodore Christian Blegen (16 July 1891 – 18 July 1969) was an American historian and writer.  Blegen was the writer of numerous historic reference books, papers and articles written over a five decade period. His primary areas of focus were of the history of the state of Minnesota and of Norwegian-American immigration.

Background
Theodore Christian Blegen was born  in Minneapolis, Minnesota to Anna Regine (1854-1925) and John H. Blegen (1851-1928), both of whom had emigrated from Lillehammer, Norway. His father was a professor at Augsburg College in Minneapolis and played a central role in the Norwegian Lutheran Church in America.  He was the younger brother of noted archaeologist Carl Blegen.

Blegen’s undergraduate studies at Augsburg College B.A. (1910) were followed by graduate work at the University of Minnesota M.A. (1915), Ph.D. (1925) that led to a doctorate in history. In 1928, he was a Guggenheim Fellow and studied in Norway.

Career

Blegen did high-school teaching at Fergus Falls, Minnesota, and at Milwaukee, Wisconsin. Blegen was a professor of history (1920–1927) at Hamline University in St. Paul, after which he moved to the University of Minnesota (1927–1939), later serving as dean of the graduate school (1940–1960).

His career with the Minnesota Historical Society began in 1922, serving an apprenticeship in the arts of editing and meticulous research. He succeeded to the position of superintendent of the historical society, and a seat on the executive council, serving until 1939. He returned to the Society as a research fellow in 1960 after his retirement from teaching.

In 1925, Blegen was appointed the first managing editor of the Norwegian-American Historical Association. During World War II, he directed the National Historical Service, preparing materials for the U.S. Army's G.I. Roundtable. He was elected president of the Organization of American Historians in 1943. He was also one of the founders of the Forest History Society, serving two terms as president. He was elected a Fellow of the Society in 1963, and for more than twenty years served on the Society's executive committee. The Forest History Society initiated the Theodore C. Blegen Award in 1972.

Blegen received recognition in the form of honorary degrees from Hamline University, Carleton College, St. Olaf College, Luther College, and Augustana College. Blegen was made honorary doctor at the University of Oslo, 1938. He was a member of the Norwegian Academy of Science and Letters from 1946 and The  Royal Norwegian Society  from 1954. In 1950 he was knighted into the Royal Norwegian Order of St. Olav. Blegen Hall on the University of Minnesota Twin Cities Campus is named after Theodore C. Blegen. The research papers of Dr. Blegen was located in the University Archives, University of Minnesota. The Minnesota Historical Society also has a collection of Theodore C. Blegen papers.

Selected bibliography
  "James Wickes Taylor: A Biographical Sketch." Minnesota History Bulletin 1.4 (1915): 153-219. online
 The historical records of the Scandinavians in America (1918) online
 "A Plan for the Union of British North America and the United States, 1866." Mississippi Valley Historical Review 4.4 (1918): 470-483. online
 "The Competition of the Northwestern States for Immigrants." Wisconsin Magazine of History (1919): 3-29. online
 "The Early Norwegian Press in America." Minnesota History Bulletin 3.8 (1920): 506-518. online
 "Cleng Peerson and Norwegian Immigration." Mississippi Valley Historical Review 7.4 (1921): 303-331. [Blegen, Theodore C. "Cleng Peerson and Norwegian Immigration." The Mississippi Valley Historical Review 7.4 (1921): 303-331. online]
Norwegian Migration to America, 1825-1860 (1931) 
Norwegian Emigrant Songs and Ballads (1936)
Building Minnesota (1938) online free to borrow
A Review and a Challenge (1938)
Norwegian Migration to America: The American Transition (1940)
Grass Roots History (1947)
The Land Lies Open (1949)
 With Various Voices Recordings Of North Star Life (1949) online
Lincoln's Imagery: A Study in Word Power (1954) online
 Editor, Land of their choice: the immigrants write home (U of Minnesota Press, 1955).
Minnesota: A History of the State (1963)
Kensington Rune Stone, New Light on an Old Riddle (1968)

References

Additional Source
Flanagan, John T. (1977) Theodore C Blegen, a Memoir ( Northfield, MN: Norwegian-American Historical Association) 
Commager, Henry Steele  (1961) Immigration and American history : essays in honor of Theodore C. Blegen (Minneapolis, MN : University of Minnesota Press)

External links
Portrait of Theodore C. Blegen
Forest History Society's Theodore C. Blegen Award

American people of Norwegian descent
Augsburg University alumni
20th-century American historians
American male non-fiction writers
1891 births
1969 deaths
University of Minnesota College of Liberal Arts alumni
American Lutherans
People from Fergus Falls, Minnesota
20th-century Lutherans
20th-century American male writers